The Myrene Apartment Building is an historic structure located at 703 6th Street, Northwest, Washington, D.C., in the Chinatown neighborhood.

History
J.H. McIntyre was the architect for this middle-class apartment flat with its eclectic Romanesque Revival facade.  The building exemplifies the evolution of multi-family apartment buildings from the row-house form.  It was listed on the National Register of Historic Places in 1994.

See also
 National Register of Historic Places listings in central Washington, D.C.

References

External links
 

Apartment buildings in Washington, D.C.
Residential buildings completed in 1898
Residential buildings on the National Register of Historic Places in Washington, D.C.
Victorian architecture in Washington, D.C.
Apartment buildings on the National Register of Historic Places